Ryan Allen Carrillo (born March 10, 1975) is an American television personality, trans activist, and reality show contestant.  Carrillo made his first televised personality appearance as part of Team Fab 3 on ABC's Expedition Impossible in 2011. Although Carrillo had been a professional roller skater traveling on tour with Madonna and appearing in numerous movies as a professional skater. Carrillo is also an on-air personality for AfterBuzzTV. In 2011 Carrillo appeared on Season 4 of Million Dollar Listing Los Angeles when he purchased Mexico y Barra Restaurant in West Hollywood with transgender actress Candis Cayne.

Artistic roller skating
Carrillo is one of a few openly living gay professional athletes in the world. Artistic roller skating is a sport similar to figure skating but where contestants run on roller skates instead of ice skates.  Carrillo is a three-time Southwest regional champion, U.S. silver medalist, and member of the in-line World Team. Carrillo won the 1991 USARS Figure Skating National Championship Sophomore Men's Division.  The very first Precision Roller Skating World Championships took place October 31, 1999, at the Carrara Stadium in Gold Coast Australia. Carillo represented the United States on team Holiday of Orange, California and finished in 8th place (of 8 competing). Carrillo was featured at the Osmond Family Theatre in Branson, Missouri skating for Tony Orlando and the Osmond Brothers. Carrillo was the featured roller skater in Madonna's "Sorry" music video. Out Magazine labeled him as "Madonna's Skating Boy Toy!"

Filmography

Lawsuit
Carrillo and Andrew Gruver filed a lawsuit in Los Angeles Superior Court, naming Lisa Vanderpump, "Real Housewives of Beverly Hills", and her husband as defendants and alleging breach of fiduciary duty, constructive fraud, breach of contract, and misrepresentation and deception, according to court documents.  Carillo and Gruver claim the couple "unfairly snatched the West Hollywood venue" where they intended to open a gay sports bar called Bar Varsity.

References

Living people
Artistic roller skaters
American LGBT sportspeople
1975 births
Place of birth missing (living people)
Gay sportsmen
LGBT roller skaters